The Red Line  or Line 5 is one of the three lines of Chennai Metro,  Phase 2 Project. The line will consist of 49 stations, out of which 7 are underground, 1 at grade and 41 are elevated. The government has announced feasibility studies to extend metro rail's corridor-5 from Koyambedu to Avadi via Thirumangalam, Mogappair and Ambattur. At present, the proposed corridor-5 links Madhavaram with Sholinganallur via Koyambedu, Alandur and Madipakkam.

Phase II

E. Sreedharan, in 2013, stressed on the need of a greater expansion of Chennai metro network by undertaking subsequent phases. In July 2016, the then Chief Minister J. Jayalalithaa announced that Chennai Metro Phase 2 would be 104 km long and have 104 stations. In July 2017, in a suo motu statement in the State Legislative Assembly, an extension in Phase II, involving an extension of Line 4 from Lighthouse up to Poonamallee, with the Madhavaram–Sholinganallur and Lighthouse–Poonamallee lines intersecting at Alwarthirunagar was announced, making Phase 2 118.91 km long. The key focus for Phase 2 is to connect the northern (Madhavaram, Thiruvottriyur, Redhills) and southern parts (Siruseri, Sholinganallur) and the east parts of Chennai (Light house, Mylapore) to the western parts of Chennai (Porur, Poonamallee). Tamil Nadu Road Development Corporation (TNRDC) has also proposed an elevated  four-lane corridor for the IT corridor from Taramani to Siruseri. CMRL will construct its piers on top of the flyover built by TNRDC.

Of the three corridors in phase II, Line 5 features three crossovers, where the Metro trains run over flyovers. Trains will zip over the Porur and Medavakkam flyovers, the Kathipara grade separator and another yet-to-be built flyover between Mugalivakkam and Ramapuram.

The lines 3, 4 and 5 are proposed to have   underground and  elevated routes. The present estimate for the phase 2 stands at Rs. 61,000 crore and approval has been received from the state government. Foundation stone for phase 2 was laid on 20 November 2020 by Union Home Minister Amit Shah and construction for the phase from Poonamallee to Power House of Line 4 commenced on 1 June 2021. The construction work for certain sections of the second phase of Chennai Metro Rail project is hit due to delay in the selection of the general consultant (GC) after concerns were raised by more than 50% of bidders on the CMRL shortlisting companies based on their technical qualifications. Addressing an event in Chennai, Prime Minister Narendra Modi on Sunday 14 February 2021 said the Centre has set aside Rs 63,000 crore in this year’s Budget for the second phase of Chennai Metro totaling 135 km, which is one of the largest projects sanctioned for any city in one-go. The map and list of stations for all 3 proposed lines to be part of Phase 2 has also been published by CMRL.

There are also plans to extend the Poonamallee line (Line 4) by 4 km to the proposed township of Tirumazhisai in the western part of the city by CMRL. Phase 2 is expected to be completed by 2026. Phase 2 will have trains with three and six coaches, making a total of 414 coaches.

CMRL has decided to implement LRT Metrolite, covering 17 km connecting Tambaram and Velachery railway stations along the Velachery -Tambaram Road and in February 2021, the state assembly announced that the feasibility study had started for the same to soon prepare a dpr.

Stations

References

Chennai Metro lines